The Sixteenth Assembly of Tamil Nadu succeeded the Fifteenth Assembly of Tamil Nadu and was constituted after the victory of Dravida Munnetra Kazhagam (DMK) and allies in the 2021 State Assembly Elections held on 6 April 2021. M. K Stalin was elected as Chief Minister for the first time and assumed office on 7 May 2021. His cabinet is named M. K. Stalin ministry

Office bearers 
The main officials of the Tamil Nadu Legislative Assembly are:

Composition

Members of Legislative Assembly 
 
Information derived from data produced by the Election Commission of India (ECI) except where noted. Reserved constituencies for candidates from the Scheduled Castes and Scheduled Tribes (SC / ST) were defined in 2007 by the Delimitation Commission.

Committees

2021-2023
 
Constituted on 17 June 2021 and tenure extended till 31 March 2023.

See also 

 Government of Tamil Nadu
 List of Chief Ministers of Tamil Nadu
 Legislative assembly of Tamil Nadu

References 

Government of Tamil Nadu
Tamil Nadu